Jose Carlos Diaz (born February 15, 1987) is an American former soccer player who played as a midfielder.

Career

Youth career
Born in Napa, California, he played with Vintage High School before playing two years of college soccer for St. Mary's College.

Senior career
He played for W Connection of Trinidad and Tobago in 2009. He scored two goals for the club in a 3–2 victory over Real C.D. España in the 2009–10 CONCACAF Champions League group stage.

References

External links

1987 births
Living people
Soccer players from California
People from Napa, California
American sportspeople of Mexican descent
Association football midfielders
Mexican footballers
American soccer players
Ferencvárosi TC footballers
W Connection F.C. players
Paysandu Sport Club players
Nemzeti Bajnokság I players
TT Pro League players
Expatriate footballers in Hungary
Expatriate footballers in Trinidad and Tobago
Expatriate footballers in Brazil